Aurèle Nicolet (22 January 1926 – 29 January 2016) was a Swiss flautist. He was considered one of the world's best flute players of the late twentieth century.

He performed in various international concerts. A number of composers wrote music especially for him, including Josef Tal, Toru Takemitsu, György Ligeti, Krzysztof Meyer, and Edison Denisov.

His pupils include Emmanuel Pahud, Carlos Bruneel, Michael Faust, Pedro Eustache, Thierry Fischer, Irena Grafenauer, Huáscar Barradas, Kristiyan Koev, Jadwiga Kotnowska, Robert Langevin, Tom Ottar Andreassen, Marina Piccinini, Kaspar Zehnder and Ariel Zuckermann.

He died at the age of 90 in 2016 in Freiburg im Breisgau, Germany.

Career

He was a flautist in orchestras in Winterthur and Zurich from 1948 to 1950.
He was solo flautist for the Berlin Philharmonic Orchestra from 1950 to 1959.
He was a professor in the Academy for Music in Berlin from 1952 to 1965.
He was head of the Master Class at Freiburg Conservatory from 1965 to 1981.

Awards and prizes

In 1947, at the age of 21, he was awarded First Prize for flute from Paris Conservatory.

In 1948 he won First Prize at Geneva International Music Competition.

Selected discography
 Bach: The Complete Sonatas for Flute
 Luigi Boccherini/Joseph Martin Kraus: Flute Quintets
 François-Joseph Gossec: 6 Flute Quartets
 Wolfgang Amadeus Mozart: 4 Flute Quartets
 Anton Reicha: 3 Quartets, Op. 98
 Louis Spohr: Concertante No. 2; Mozart: Concerto for Flute and Harp; Oboe Concertos
 Antonio Vivaldi: Flute Concertos Op. 10, 1-6
 Antonio Vivaldi: 6 Flute Concertos Op. 10

References

External links
 Aurèle Nicolet

1926 births
2016 deaths
People from Neuchâtel
Swiss classical flautists
Academic staff of the Hochschule für Musik Freiburg
Players of the Berlin Philharmonic
20th-century classical musicians
20th-century flautists